María Gómez may refer to:

 María Cristina Gómez (1942–1989), Baptist primary school teacher and community leader in El Salvador who was abducted and murdered
 María Gómez (handballer) (born 1984), Paraguayan team handball player
 María Gómez (weightlifter) (born 1975), Mexican weightlifter